This is a list of Queensland Rugby League clubs by competition. There are over 250 clubs in Queensland, across over 20 competitions administered by five regions.

National Rugby League

State Competitions

Queensland Cup and Hastings Deering Colts

Brisbane/Suburban Leagues

Brisbane Rugby League

Brisbane Second Division Rugby League The Poinsettias / The Stingers (Juniors)

Regional Leagues

Central Queensland Capras

Bundaberg Rugby League 

  Brothers Bundaberg
  Easts
  Hervey Bay
  Wallaroo Maryborough
  Waves Tigers
  Western Suburbs

Central Highlands Rugby League 

  Blackwater Crushers
  Bluff Rabbitohs
  Clermont Bears
  Dysart Bulls
  Emerald Brothers
  Emerald Tigers
  Middlemount Panthers
  Springsure Mountain Men

Central West Rugby League 

  Alpha Brumbies
  Barcaldine Sandgoannas
  Blackall Magpies
  Longreach-Ilfracombe Tigers
  Winton Diamantina Devils

Gladstone & District Rugby League 

  Calliope Roosters
  Brothers Gladstone
  Tannum Sands Seagulls
  Valleys Diehards Gladstone
  Wallaby RLFC

Rockhampton & District Rugby League 

  Biloela Panthers
  Brothers Rockhampton
  Emu Park RLFC
  Fitzroy-Gracemere Sharks
  Norths Chargers
  Yeppoon Seagulls

South West Queensland Mustangs

Roma District Rugby League 

  Chinchilla Bulldogs
  Roma Cities
  Miles Devils
  Mitchell Magpies
  St George Dragons
  Taroom-Wandoan Battlers
  Wallumbilla-Surat Red Bulls
  Western Ringers

Toowoomba Rugby League 

  Brothers Toowoomba
  Dalby Devils
  Gatton Hawks
  Goondiwindi Boars
  Highfields Eagles
  Newtown Lions
  Oakey Bears
  Pittsworth Danes
  Southern Suburbs Tigers
  Toowoomba Valleys Roosters
  Warwick Cowboys
  Wattles Warriors

Border Rivers Rugby League (Part of Toowoomba Rugby League)

  Stanthorpe Gremlins
  Tenterfield Tigers (NSWCRL)
  Texas Terriers
  Inglewood Roosters

Defunct Competitions 

 Western Rugby League

Wide Bay Bulls

Central Burnett Rugby League 

  Gayndah
  Monto
  Mundubbera

Northern Districts Rugby League 

  Agnes Water
  Avondale
  Gin Gin
  Miriam Vale
  South Kolan

South Burnett Rugby League 

  Cherbourg Hornets
  Kingaroy Red Ants
  Murgon Mustangs
  Nanango Stags
  Wondai Proston Wolves

Sunshine Coast Gympie Rugby League 

  Beachmere
  Beerwah Bulldogs
  Bribie Island Warrigals
  Caboolture Snakes
  Caloundra Sharks
  Coolum Colts
  Gympie Devils
  Kawana Dolphins
  Maroochydore-Coolum Swans
  Nambour Crushers
  Noosa Pirates
  Palmwoods Devils
  Pomona-Cooran Cutters
  Yandina Raiders

North Queensland Marlins

Cairns District Rugby League 

  Atherton Roosters
  Cairns Brothers
  Innisfail Brothers
  Edmonton Storm
  Ivanhoes Knights
  Cairns Kangaroos
  Mareeba Gladiators
  Mossman Port Douglas Sharks
  Southern Suburbs Cockatoos
  Tully Tigers
  Yarrabah Seahawks

Mackay & District Rugby League 

  Brothers Mackay
  Carltons
  Magpies
  Moranbah Miners
  Sarina Crocodiles
  Souths
  Wests
  Whitsundays Brahmans

Mount Isa Rugby League 

  Mt Isa Brothers

  Cloncurry
  Black Star Diehards
  Mt Isa Townies
  Mt Isa Wranglers
  Mt Isa Wanderers

Remote Areas Rugby League 

  Aurukun Kang Kang

  Central Cape Suns
  Cooktown Crocs
  Hope Vale Cockatoos
  Lockhart River Scorpions
  Mulga Tigers
  Napranum Bulldogs
  Old Mapoon
  Pormpuraaw Crocs
  Weipa Raiders
  Wujal Wujal Yindili
  Zenadth Kes RLFC

Townsville & District Rugby League 

  Townsville Brothers
  Burdekin (Ayr)
  Centrals Tigers
  Charters Towers Miners
  Herbert River Crushers
  Norths Devils
  Western Lions

Defunct Competitions 

 Mid West Rugby League
 Northern Peninsula Area Rugby League

South East Poinsettias

Gold Coast Rugby League (The Vikings) 

  Beaudesert Kingfishers
  Burleigh Bears
  Coolangatta Knights
  Coomera Cutters
  Currumbin Eagles
  Helensvale Hornets
  Jimboomba Thunder
  Mount Tamborine Bushrats
  Mudgeeraba Redbacks
  Nerang Roosters
  Ormeau Shearers
  Parkwood Sharks
  Robina Raptors
  Runaway Bay Seagulls
  South Tweed Koalas
  Southport Tigers
  Tugun Seahawks
  Tweed Heads Seagulls

Ipswich Rugby League (The Diggers) 

  Brisbane Valley Bulls
  Brothers Ipswich Leprechauns
  Fassifern Bombers
  Goodna Eagles
  Karalee Tornadoes
  Laidley Lions
  Lowood Stags
  Northern Suburbs Tigers
  Redbank Plains Bears
  Rosewood Roosters
  Springfield Panthers
  Ipswich Swifts Bluebirds
  West End Bulldogs

References 

Australian rugby league lists
Lists of rugby league clubs
Lists of sports teams in Australia
Lists of sports clubs in Australia